Brooks County is a county in Texas, and Falfurrias is its county seat. Its population was 7,076, about 88% Latino per the 2020 census. It is one of Texas’s poorest counties.  

The county is named for James Abijah Brooks, one of the “Four Captains” who modernized the Texas Rangers. He retired to Farfurrias, served two terms as state representative, lobbied successfully for the county’s creation, and served thirty years as county judge.  

Brooks County has several large ranches, including Mariposa Ranch and the King Ranch, both in the east. The county’s largest employer is the Falfurrias Border Patrol interior checkpoint on US 281, built in 1994 outside the city limits and significantly enlarged in 2019.

"Death Valley" for Migrants

Brooks County is "the nation's busiest corridor for illegal immigration;" and a tracking camera records up to 150 people going through one piece of property nightly. More illegal migrants die in Brooks County than in any other county in America. Although it is about  miles north of the border, it is on a main route headed toward San Antonio and Dallas from Mexico. The documentary Missing in Brooks County called the county the "epicenter" of America's immigration problem.  It was called a "Death Valley" for migrants in 2014. 

Many migrants attempt to bypass the Falfurrias United States Border Patrol interior checkpoint by hiking some  around it through the open, dry terrain local ranchers call "the killing fields.” The terrain is flat, sandy, and hard to walk on. The lack of landmarks can be disorienting, causing some migrants to walk in circles. Those attempting the trip with smugglers can be subject to mistreatment, including ransom and rape. 

Migrants in distress call 911, and there typically are "a few dozen cellphone calls a day. Between 2016 and 2018, there were 722 calls leading to Border Patrol rescues, usually resulting in arrest or deportation. The Border Patrol apprehends between 60 and 70 undocumented immigrants daily. Tom Slowinski, in charge of the Falfurrias Border Patrol facility in 2019, said, "No other checkpoint anywhere on the Southwest border catches more alien smuggling cases than this checkpoint right here."

Illegal immigrant death is also a significant issue. Between 2009 and 2018, over 600 bodies were recovered. Most are not identified. Consequently, Brooks County has been described as "the biggest cemetery in America.” According to Brooks County Deputy Sheriff Benny Martinez, the multiple of found to unfound bodies is probably 5 to 10 times. One estimate is that there are over 2000 unfound bodies. Consistent with these estimates, the number of reported missing persons exceeds the number of bodies recovered. 

The illegal immigration issue is a significant challenge for Brooks County. Migrants bypassing the Border Patrol checkpoint sometimes damage property, tear down fences, steal, or threaten residents of the ranches through which they trespass. Residents resent the reputation the Border Patrol checkpoint and migrant deaths have given their county. Most importantly, the cost of addressing these issues has overwhelmed county resources, and the county has been unsuccessful in getting additional federal help for the local impact of a significant national issue. 

The drain on local services is significant. The Border Patrol does not answer 911 calls or recover or bury dead bodies, so that falls on the county. The Brooks County Sheriff’s Department, which once had 12 deputies, now has two, who work 48 hour weeks in aging vehicles with no health insurance. The Ed Rachal Memorial Library, Books County’s only public library, is only open one day a week as of 2021. 

In contrast, the Border Patrol has in its Brooks County facility, the largest border checkpoint in the country, modern equipment, dozens of 4-wheel drive trucks with infrared night-vision capabilities, a car wash, a helicopter, a blimp, a canine team, and 300 agents.

Measures to help the illegal migrants
 South Texas Human Rights, based in Brooks County, operates a hotline to answer calls about missing persons.
 Humanitarian groups have set up water stations and emergency beacons on some Brooks County ranches. Doing so is illegal, and the Border Patrol sometimes arrests offenders, but jurors in Arizona refused to convict a defendant tried for the same crime.  Consequently, not all ranchers allow the water stations on their property. Those that do, reduce the likelihood that their property will have dead bodies. 
 The water stations and signs in the fields have their geographical coordinates, so migrants calling for help can tell rescuers where they are.
 Due to property damage, some ranchers have stopped using fencing or placed ladders so the migrants can climb over the fences without damaging them. One rancher, however, electrified his fencing with a 220-volt electric line.
 Forrest Wilder, editor of the Texas Observer, has called for the Farfurrias Border Patrol Station to be moved to a less dangerous location.

Measures against the migrants
 Fourteen water stations were stolen in 2016.
 The South Texans' Property Rights Association, with over 600 members, tracks which landowners permit water stations and which do not.
 Texas Border Volunteers, a paramilitary group, apprehends and turns illegal migrants over to the Border Patrol. A co-founder is veterinarian Michael Vickers, who was in Missing in Brooks County.

Geography

Major highways
  U.S. Highway 281
  Interstate 69C is currently under construction and will follow the current route of U.S. 281 in most places.
  State Highway 285
  Farm to Market Road 755

Adjacent counties
 Jim Wells County (north)
 Kleberg County (northeast)
 Kenedy County (east)
 Hidalgo County (south)
 Starr County (southwest)
 Jim Hogg County (west)
 Duval County (northwest)

Demographics

As of the 2020 United States census, there were 7,076 people, 2,475 households, and 1,419 families residing in the county. As of the 2010 United States Census,  7,223 people were living in the county; 89.6% were White, 0.5% African American, 0.3% Native American, 0.3% Asian, 7.9% of some other race, and 1.4% of two or more races. About 91.2% were Hispanic or Latino (of any race).

As of the census of 2000,  7,976 people, 2,711 households, and 2,079 families were residing in the county. The 3,203 housing units averaged . The racial makeup of the county was 75.84% White, 0.19% African American, 0.46% Native American, 0.09% Asian, 0.08% Pacific Islander, 21.58% from other races, and 1.77% from two or more races. About 91.57% of the population was Hispanic or Latino of any race.

Of the 2,711 households, 38.90% had children under the age of 18 living with them, 52.20% were married couples living together, 19.10% had a female householder with no husband present, and 23.30% were not families. About 21.40% of all households were made up of individuals, and 11.30% had someone living alone who was 65 years of age or older. The average household size was 2.92, and the average family size was 3.38.

In the county, the age distribution was 31.60% under the age of 18, 8.90% from 18 to 24, 23.40% from 25 to 44, 21.70% from 45 to 64, and 14.40% who were 65 years of age or older. The median age was 34 years. For every 100 females there were 94.20 males. For every 100 females age 18 and over, there were 89.90 males.

The median income for a household in the county was $18,622, and for a family was $22,473. Males had a median income of $23,051 versus $16,103 for females. The per capita income for the county was $10,234. About 36.90% of families and 40.20% of the population were below the poverty line, including 51.70% of those under age 18 and 30.40% of those age 65 or over.

Politics
While Texas has become a Republican Party stronghold in the 21st century, Brooks County remains solidly Democratic. The only Republican to have carried Brooks County was State Comptroller Susan Combs, who ran unopposed for re-election in 2010.

No Republican presidential candidate has received a majority of the vote since the county’s establishment in 1911. The highest Republican vote getters have been Richard Nixon, with 35% in his 1972 landslide and Donald Trump, with over 40% in 2020. Only three Democratic candidates have received less than 60% of the vote: Adlai Stevenson with almost 58% in 1956; George McGovern with 59.5%  in 1972; and Joe Biden with 59% in 2020, the worst performance by a Democratic candidate in Brooks County since 1956.

Communities

City
 Falfurrias (county seat)

Census-designated places
 Airport Road Addition
 Cantu Addition
 Encino
 Flowella

Unincorporated community
 Rachal

Education
Brooks County Independent School District is the local K-12 school district.

Coastal Bend College (formerly Bee County College) is the county’s designated community college.

Movie
 Missing in Brooks County is a feature-length documentary that examines the deaths in Brooks County of migrants avoiding the U.S. Border Patrol checkpoint near Falfurrias. The film has won numerous movie festival awards. As of November 2021, RottenTomatoes has given it a 100% rating. The movie tells the story of the county’s plight with migrants, including the severe budget implications of the large, unreimbursed expense for recovering and burying migrants who died from dehydration or exposure. It was released for streaming November 2, 2021, and has been shown in selected theaters. It was shown on PBS's Independent Lens series in January 2022.

See also

 Brooks County Courthouse
 Kinney County, Texas, also overwhelmed by migrants

References

Further reading (most recent first)

External links
 Brooks County in Handbook of Texas Online.
 Brooks County Profile from the Texas Association of Counties

 
1911 establishments in Texas
Populated places established in 1911
Illegal immigration to the United States
Majority-minority counties in Texas
Hispanic and Latino American culture in Texas